Todor Toshev (1919 - 1993) was a Bulgarian Double bass (contrabass) player.

Todor Toshev was born in Bulgaria. He was the creator of the Bulgarian school of double bass and the first double bass professor in the country.

Toshev graduated from the Music Academy in Sofia/class of Asen Vapordjiev (who was a well known Bulgarian musician, a graduate from the Prague Conservatory/class of Eduard Nani) in 1948 . He continued his studies in the Prague Conservatory with professor Oldrih Shoreis until 1951. He returned to Bulgaria and established the roots of the Modern Bulgarian School of Double Bass which was gaining recognition and respect. He performed consistently in the country and abroad, furthering the popularity of his school. There are a number of recordings from this time being kept in the library of the Bulgarian National Radio. He taught masterclasses in England, Germany, Switzerland, Greece and Finland and became a member of the International Society of Bassists-Huston, USA, earning a PHD “honoris causa” in the Musical Academy “Ian Sibelius” in Finland and Bulgarian National Music Academy in Sofia. He was then featured in the 16th Edition of the Cambridge “Who is Who” Music encyclopedia.

Todor Toshev was a forward thinking Music teacher. His many students established and continue to lead the standards of his teachings. His methods are still being applied by his students who are now well known teachers and performers around the world. His contribution to the development of the instrument was huge, transforming the Double Bass from an accompanying instrument in an orchestra to a “Soloist” instrument. The quality and popularity of the instrument today is partly due to his astounding contribution.

References

1919 births
1993 deaths
Bulgarian musicians
Double-bassists
Male double-bassists
20th-century double-bassists
20th-century male musicians